Snagglepuss is a Hanna-Barbera cartoon character who debuted in prototype form in 1959 and established as a studio regular by 1961. A light pink anthropomorphic cougar sporting an upturned collar, shirt cuffs, and bow tie, Snagglepuss enjoys the fine things in life and shows particular affinity for the theatre. His stories routinely break the fourth wall as the character addresses the audience in self-narration, soliloquy, and asides. As originally voiced by Daws Butler, Snagglepuss seeks quasi-Shakespearean turns of phrase. Some of his campy verbal mannerisms became catchphrases: "Heavens to Murgatroyd!", "Exit, stage left!", and a fondness for closing sentences with the emphatic "even."

History
A pink mountain lion known as "Snaggletooth", featuring the eventual character's general manner and Bert Lahr-inspired voice but without collar or cuffs, first appeared on television in The Quick Draw McGraw Show in 1959. The character subsequently appeared in a supporting role in Augie Doggie and Doggie Daddy and Snooper and Blabber. Under the revised name Snagglepuss the character appeared in his own series of shorts in 1961 as a regular segment on The Yogi Bear Show, featuring in 32 episodes. He later appeared in other Hanna-Barbera shows, including Yogi's Gang (1973), as a co-host in Laff-A-Lympics (1977–78), Yogi's Treasure Hunt (1985), and as a teenager in Yo Yogi! (1991).

Snagglepuss's appearance in a 1960s run of Kellogg's cereal television commercials prompted legal action by actor Bert Lahr, who said the similarity of the character's voice to his own could lead viewers to the false conclusion that Lahr himself had endorsed the product. As part of the settlement, the disclaimer "Snagglepuss voice by Daws Butler" was required to appear on each commercial. This made Butler one of the few voice artists to receive screen credits in a TV commercial.

Butler reused his Snagglepuss voice for two other Hanna-Barbera characters: Jonathan Wellington "Mudsy" Muddlemore from The Funky Phantom and Brutus the lion from The Roman Holidays.

Character
Snagglepuss lives in a cavern, which he constantly tries to make more habitable for himself. No matter what he does, however, he always winds up back where he started or worse off than he was before. In some episodes, Snagglepuss is chased by Major Minor (voiced by Don Messick), a tiny-sized hunter. A few episodes involved him trying to court a lioness named Lila (voiced by Jean Vander Pyl) but who always rejected his advances for being too boorish or pathetic.

Butler's voicing of the character recalls the work of actor Bert Lahr, especially the more mellow moods of Lahr's Cowardly Lion in the 1939 film The Wizard of Oz.

Snagglepuss has three signature catchphrases. His most famous is his perpetual exclamation "Heavens to Murgatroyd!" Before dashing offscreen to make an escape or run an errand, Snagglepuss announces the move in the form of a theatrical stage direction, saying "Exit, stage left!" (or "right," as the case may be, or "up" or "down" even). Finally, Snagglepuss tends to add the word "even" for emphasis at the ends of sentences:
 After emphasizing a previous statement ("Somebody hurt! In dire pain, even!").
 After stating a synonymous phrase ("On account of I must be a little rusty. Stale, even").
 In a grammatically correct way, though out of order in the sentence ("I wonder if he knows my telephone number, even").
 Simply added as an exclamation ("Heavens to Murgatroyd! A veritabububble frankenmouse monster, even!").

Snagglepuss' pink color, lilting voice and theatrical manner led to the character being interpreted by some viewers over the years as stereotypically gay. This conjecture was touched upon over the years in many parodies but was seriously explored in a retelling of the character's life titled Exit, Stage Left!: The Snagglepuss Chronicles, a 2018 comic miniseries from DC Comics that was part of their Hanna-Barbera Beyond initiative.

Titles

Other appearances

Hanna-Barbera
 Snagglepuss appeared in Yogi's Ark Lark (1972) and Yogi's Gang (1973). In Yogi's Gang, he is often referred to as a tiger and not a mountain lion.
 Snagglepuss acted as a co-host with Mildew Wolf from the Cattanooga Cats segment "It's the Wolf" on Scooby's All-Star Laff-A-Lympics and Scooby's All-Stars (1977–79).
 Snagglepuss made a special guest appearance at a celebrity roast honoring Fred Flintstone in the TV special Hanna-Barbera's All-Star Comedy Ice Revue (1978).
 Snagglepuss also appeared in the animated holiday specials Casper's First Christmas (1979), Yogi's First Christmas (1980) and Yogi Bear's All Star Comedy Christmas Caper (1982).
 Snagglepuss was a regular in Yogi's Treasure Hunt.
 Snagglepuss appeared in four television films which were part of the Hanna-Barbera Superstars 10 series:
 Yogi's Great Escape (1987)
 Yogi Bear and the Magical Flight of the Spruce Goose (1987)
 The Good, the Bad, and Huckleberry Hound (1988)
 Snagglepuss appeared in A Yabba Dabba Doo Celebration: 50 Years of Hanna-Barbera (1989), voiced by Greg Burson.
 In the "Fender Bender 500" segment of Wake, Rattle, and Roll, Snagglepuss was paired up with Huckleberry Hound as they drove a monster truck called the Half-Dog, Half-Cat, Half-track; it resembled a portable stage, which was perfectly appropriate for both Huck and Snag.
 Snagglepuss was featured as a teenager in Yo Yogi!, again voiced by Greg Burson.
 Snagglepuss was seen in a Cartoon Network Rap in 1995.
 Snagglepuss made a non-speaking cameo in the Harvey Birdman, Attorney at Law episode "Peanut Puberty".
 Snagglepuss starred in an eight-page DC Comics' story within Suicide Squad/Banana Splits Annual #1 by writer Mark Russell and artist Mike Feehan. The eight-page story was then followed by a 6-issue comic miniseries Exit, Stage Left!: The Snagglepuss Chronicles (also by Mark Russell) with the first issue released on January 3, 2018. The comic depicted Snagglepuss as a gay playwright living in 1950s New York City whose career featured parallels to that of Tennessee Williams and was also given a male human lover named Pablo who he was in a closeted relationship with. The comics also featured Huckleberry Hound and Quick Draw McGraw as supporting characters who were also in a gay relationship that were initially supportive of Snagglepuss only for their own lives to fall to ruin due to a McCarthyist purge which ends up putting Huckleberry in jail. The comic later won a GLAAD Award for Outstanding Comic Book.
 Snagglepuss appears in the Wacky Races episode "Much Ado About Wacky".
 Snagglepuss appears in Jellystone!, voiced by Dana Snyder. He appears as one of the many residents in the cartoon town of Jellystone where he works for the entertainment industry. He is also gay.
 On December 1, 2022, it was announced Snagglepuss will be in a new untitled animated series. He will be voiced by Jim Parsons.

Non-Hanna-Barbera
 In The Simpsons episode "Sweet Seymour Skinner's Baadasssss Song" (April 28, 1994), Miss Hoover reminds Ralph Wiggum that he once reported seeing Snagglepuss outside in the hallway. Ralph responds, "he was going to the bathroom". In the other episode "Lady Bouvier's Lover" (May 12, 1994), Comic Book Guy shows Bart a cel of Snagglepuss as an example of a cel that is actually worth something, as opposed to the cel of Scratchy's arm that Bart was trying to sell to him.
 Snagglepuss appeared in the Robot Chicken episode "Ban on the Fun". In the "Laff-A-Munich" skit, he is seen on a television set, telling the audience about the disappearance of the Yogi Yahooeys. He was not seen again after this. He was voiced by Victor Yerrid.
 In the adult animated sitcom Drawn Together, Snagglepuss is featured in the episode "Gay Bash", but his face is blurred, referencing how strangers are blurred on reality programs. He was voiced by Chris Edgerly.
 Snagglepuss made a brief cameo in The Grim Adventures of Billy & Mandy episode "Irwin Gets a Clue", being hit by Hoss Delgado's truck.
 Snagglepuss made two cameos in a MetLife commercial in 2012, titled "Everyone". In a behind the scenes video, Snagglepuss (voiced by Stephen Stanton) acts and rehearses in front of the director of the ad, only for the director to tell him he does not have any speaking roles in the ad, and in response, Snagglepuss storms out of the trailer.
 On a Season 34: Episode 8 "Weekend Update" segment on Saturday Night Live (November 15, 2008), Bobby Moynihan appears in costume as Snagglepuss to comment on California's ban on same-sex marriage. During the segment, Snagglepuss is "outed" by anchor Seth Meyers and then confesses that his domestic partner is fellow Hanna-Barbera cartoon character The Great Gazoo, who also makes a cameo played by Will Forte.
 Snagglepuss made a cameo appearance in the Animaniacs revival segment "Suffragette City".

See also
 List of Hanna-Barbera characters
 List of works produced by Hanna-Barbera
 The Yogi Bear Show

References

External links
 Big Cartoon DataBase: Snagglepuss
 Wingnut Toons: List of episodes
 TV Acres: Snagglepuss
 The Cartoon Scrapbook – Information and details on Snagglepuss.
 

Television characters introduced in 1959
Animated characters introduced in 1959
Hanna-Barbera characters
DC Comics characters
Fictional actors
Fictional characters who break the fourth wall
Fictional mountain lions
Fictional LGBT characters in television
Fictional gay males
Yogi Bear characters
Anthropomorphic cats
YTV (Canadian TV channel) original programming
Male characters in animation
LGBT characters in animation
LGBT characters in animated television series